Sporting Athens women's basketball (Greek: Σπόρτιγκ Αθήνα KAE) is a Greek women's professional basketball team that is located at Ano Patissia, Athens, Greece, at the area of Elia Zervou 89 and Sarantaporou. The club's full name is A.O. Sporting Athens women's basketball.

History
In Greek women’s basketball, Sporting is the most successful team, having won 21 Greek Women's League championships. During the period of 1976-1999, the team won 20 championships. Another championship was won in 2004, which is the last championship of the team. Sporting's women's team has also won three Greek Women's Cups. An important achievement of Sporting's women's section was their participation in the Final Four of EuroLeague Women twice, in the 1990–91 season, and the 1991–92 season. In the last season, Sporting played in the Greek Women’s Second Division.

Honors
Greek Women's League Championships: (21)
1976, 1977, 1979, 1980, 1981, 1983, 1984, 1985, 1986, 1987, 1988, 1989, 1990, 1991, 1993, 1994, 1995, 1996, 1997, 1999, 2004
Greek Women's Cups: (3)
 1996, 1999, 2005
 EuroLeague Women Final Fours: 2
 1991, 1992

See also
Sporting Athens B.C.

References

External links
Official Website 
Eurobasket.com Sporting Athens Women's Team Profile

Women's basketball teams in Greece
Basketball teams in Athens
Basketball teams established in 1924
Women in Athens